The 2019–20 Lafayette Leopards men's basketball team represented Lafayette College during the 2019–20 NCAA Division I men's basketball season. The Leopards, led by 25th-year head coach Fran O'Hanlon, played their home games at the Kirby Sports Center in Easton, Pennsylvania as members of the Patriot League. They finished the season 19–12, 10–8 in Patriot League play to finish in a tie for fourth place. They defeated Army in the quarterfinals of the Patriot League tournament before losing in the semifinals to Colgate.

Roster

Schedule and results

|-
!colspan=9 style=| Non-conference regular season

|-
!colspan=9 style=| Patriot League regular season

|-
!colspan=9 style=| Patriot League tournament

|-

Source

References

Lafayette Leopards men's basketball seasons
Lafayette
Lafayette
Lafayette